Axel Leohard Sundquist (May 26, 1867 as Axel Leonard S. - December 22, 1910 ) was a chief carpenter (warrant officer) serving in the United States Navy who received the Medal of Honor for bravery during the Spanish–American War.

Biography
Sundquist was born May 26, 1867, in Furland, Jakobstad (= Finland), Russia and later emigrated to the United States.  He enlisted in the United States Navy on August 31, 1893.

During the Spanish–American War in 1898 he was a chief carpenter's mate aboard the cruiser U.S.S. Marblehead.  He received the Medal of Honor for his efforts in clearing 27 contact mines from Guantánamo Bay in July 1898.

He was warranted as a carpenter on December 12, 1898, and received the Medal of Honor seven days later.  In March 1903 he was assigned to the Naval Torpedo Station in Newport, Rhode Island.  He was promoted to chief carpenter on December 12, 1904.

Sundquist died on December 22, 1910, and is buried in Braman Cemetery in Newport.

Awards
Medal of Honor
Good Conduct Medal
Sampson Medal
Spanish Campaign Medal

Medal of Honor citation
Rank and organization: Chief Carpenter's Mate, U.S. Navy. Born: 26 May 1867, Furland, Russia. Accredited to: Pennsylvania. G.O. No.: 500, 19 December 1898.

Citation:
On board the U.S.S. Marblehead at the approaches to Caimanera, Guantanamo Bay, Cuba, 26 and 27 July 1898. Displaying heroism, Sundquist took part in the perilous work of sweeping for and disabling 27 contact mines during this period.

See also

List of Medal of Honor recipients for the Spanish–American War

References

External links

1867 births
1910 deaths
United States Navy Medal of Honor recipients
United States Navy sailors
American military personnel of the Spanish–American War
Emigrants from the Russian Empire to the United States
Military personnel from Pennsylvania
Foreign-born Medal of Honor recipients
Spanish–American War recipients of the Medal of Honor
Burials in Rhode Island